Darren Mark Caskey (born 21 August 1974) is an English football coach and former professional footballer.

As a player, he was a midfielder who notably played in the Premier League for Tottenham Hotspur. He also played in the Football League for Watford, Reading, Notts County, Bristol City, Peterborough United and Rushden & Diamonds, in the United States with Virginia Beach Mariners and in non-league football with Hornchurch, Kettering Town, Halesowen Town, Ilkeston Town and Gateshead. He was capped at England U18 and U19 level.

Since retirement, Caskey has coached at Ilkeston Town, later taking on the role as assistant manager at Wrexham before a similar spell at York City.

Club career
Caskey was born in Basildon, Essex. A central midfielder, he started his career as a trainee at Tottenham Hotspur, but failed to live up to early potential. He went on to have notable spells at Reading and Notts County, also playing for Peterborough United and Rushden & Diamonds, where he scored once against Shrewsbury Town. He ended his career as a player and assistant manager with Ilkeston Town, remaining in the same role with Ilkeston after the original club's liquidation.

International career
He captained the England national under-18 team that won the 1993 UEFA European Under-18 Championship, scoring the winning penalty kick in the 1–0 victory against Turkey in the final. He was capped by the England schools team.

Coaching career
Caskey combined his playing duties with the role of assistant manager for Ilkeston Town and Ilkeston under manager Kevin Wilson. In September 2013, he became assistant manager at Gateshead under Gary Mills.

Caskey followed Mills to Wrexham on 1 June 2015, after compensation was agreed between the two clubs. Caskey left the club on 26 October 2016, shortly after Mills was dismissed. Caskey had already been assisting Mills after his appointment at York City, working without a title or a contract. He eventually adopted the position of football consultant. He was dismissed alongside Mills on 30 September 2017.

Personal life
His son Jake plays for Charlton Athletic, transferring from Brighton & Hove Albion in January 2017.

Honours
Individual
PFA Team of the Year: 1999–2000 Second Division

References

External links

Profile at Havant & Waterlooville
Statistics 2004/05 at SoccerFactsUK

1974 births
Living people
Sportspeople from Basildon
English footballers
England schools international footballers
England youth international footballers
Association football midfielders
Tottenham Hotspur F.C. players
Watford F.C. players
Reading F.C. players
Notts County F.C. players
Bristol City F.C. players
Hornchurch F.C. players
Peterborough United F.C. players
Bath City F.C. players
Havant & Waterlooville F.C. players
Virginia Beach Mariners players
Rushden & Diamonds F.C. players
Kettering Town F.C. players
Halesowen Town F.C. players
Ilkeston Town F.C. (1945) players
Ilkeston F.C. players
Gateshead F.C. players
Premier League players
English Football League players
National League (English football) players
Gateshead F.C. non-playing staff
Wrexham A.F.C. non-playing staff
York City F.C. non-playing staff
English expatriate sportspeople in the United States
Expatriate soccer players in the United States
English expatriate footballers